The 1993–94 Temple Owls men's basketball team represented Temple University as a member of the Atlantic 10 Conference during the 1993–94 NCAA Division I men's basketball season. The team was led by head coach John Chaney and played their home games at McGonigle Hall. The Owls received an at-large bid to the NCAA tournament as No. 4 seed in the East region. Temple defeated No. 13 seed Drexel in the opening round before falling to No. 5 seed Indiana, 67–58. The team finished with a record of 23–8 (12–4 A-10).

Roster

Schedule and results

|-
!colspan=9 style=| Regular Season

|-
!colspan=9 style=| Atlantic 10 Tournament

|-
!colspan=9 style=| NCAA Tournament

Rankings

References

Temple Owls men's basketball seasons
Temple
Temple
Temple
Temple